Walter William Harris (born November 9, 1946) is a former American football player and coach. Harris served as the head football coach at the University of the Pacific in Stockton, California from 1989 to 1991, the University of Pittsburgh from 1997 to 2004, and at Stanford University from 2005 to 2006, compiling a career college football record of 69–85.

Playing and coaching career
Harris attended El Camino High School in South San Francisco, California. Harris received a bachelor's degree in 1968 and a master's degree in 1969 from the University of the Pacific, where he played college football.

Harris served as offensive coordinator at University of Tennessee under Johnny Majors, helping the Volunteers win four of five bowl games while there.  In 1989, he became head coach at the University of the Pacific.  As head coach of Pacific, his staff included future National Football League head coaches Jon Gruden and Hue Jackson.

Harris was the quarterbacks coach for the New York Jets from 1992 to 1994.  A noted quarterback tutor, he helped Boomer Esiason return to form and earn a trip to the 1993 Pro Bowl.

Pittsburgh
When Harris took over at the University of Pittsburgh in 1997, the Pittsburgh Panthers football program was in decline.  They had won just 12 games in the previous four seasons. He eventually led Pitt to five consecutive bowl games.

In 1997 Harris won Big East Coach of the Year honors when he led his team to the Liberty Bowl, their first postseason game since 1989.  Harris led the Panthers to back-to-back 7–5 seasons and bowl appearances in 2000 and 2001. In 2002, Pittsburgh finished 9-4 after beating Oregon State, 38–13, in the Insight Bowl. That year, he won the American Football Coaches Foundation (AFCA) Region I Coach of the Year.  The Panthers went 8–5 after losing to Virginia in the Continental Tire Bowl in 2003.

Harris coached both Antonio Bryant and Larry Fitzgerald to the Fred Biletnikoff Award, given to the nation's outstanding receiver at any position.

In 2004, Harris led the Panthers to their first Bowl Championship Series (BCS) bowl game in school history, and their first major bowl appearance in 21 years.  Pitt lost to Utah in the Fiesta Bowl that season.  Prior to the Fiesta Bowl it was rumored that Harris had accepted a head coaching position at Stanford.  After winning the Big East Coach of the Year award, Harris made it official, using his rising profile to leave Pittsburgh for Stanford.

Stanford
Harris was the head coach of the football team at Stanford University. In his first season as head coach there he posted a record of 5–6, including a 20-17 loss at home to UC Davis of the Great West Conference. In his second season as head coach the team posted a 1–11 record, the school's worst since going 0–10 in 1960. Harris was notorious for the extremely rare and bizarre decision to punt on 3rd down while trailing UCLA 7-0 on October 1, 2006 during his second season. He was fired on December 4, 2006, two days after Stanford's regular season ended.  By the end of his tenure at Stanford, Harris had surpassed Jack Curtice with the lowest winning percentage in the history of Stanford football, with a .261 mark.

Akron
In February 2009 he joined the University of Akron coaching staff as quarterbacks coach and passing game coordinator, but the team struggled and head coach J. D. Brookhart lost his job at the end of the year.

California (PA)
In April 2010, Harris became the offensive coordinator at California University of Pennsylvania. He was replaced after one season.

Coaching style
Harris has been viewed by some players as difficult to work with. One article about his departure from Stanford called him a "disciplinarian" and reported that a player briefly quit the team in protest of his coaching style.

Harris also has a questionable history of play calling, particularly when it comes to his tenure at the University of Pittsburgh. In a controversial series of calls he had Tyler Palko quarterback punt on third down a number of times in a 2004 game against Nebraska which the Panthers lost. Harris was also criticized after the 2003 Continental Tire Bowl for under-utilizing  Heisman Trophy runner-up and eventual third overall NFL draft pick Larry Fitzgerald.

Head coaching record

References

External links
 California (PA) profile

1946 births
Living people
American football cornerbacks
Air Force Falcons football coaches
Akron Zips football coaches
California Golden Bears football coaches
California Vulcans football coaches
Illinois Fighting Illini football coaches
Michigan State Spartans football coaches
New York Jets coaches
Ohio State Buckeyes football coaches
Pacific Tigers football coaches
Pacific Tigers football players
Pittsburgh Panthers football coaches
Stanford Cardinal football coaches
Tennessee Volunteers football coaches
High school football coaches in California
People from South San Francisco, California
Coaches of American football from California
Players of American football from California
Sportspeople from the San Francisco Bay Area